Innesoconcha is a genus of four species of tiny glass-snails that are endemic to Australia's Lord Howe Island in the Tasman Sea.

Species
 Innesoconcha aberrans Iredale, 1944 – black face glass-snail
 Innesoconcha catletti (Brazier, 1872) – Catlett's yellow glass-snail
 Innesoconcha princeps Iredale, 1944 – banded golden glass-snail
 Innesoconcha segna Iredale, 1944 – pale glass-snail

References

 
Gastropod genera
Taxa named by Tom Iredale
Gastropods described in 1944
Gastropods of Lord Howe Island